Bruno Filippini (born 3 March 1945) is an Italian singer, mainly successful in the 1960s.

Life and career 
Born in Rome, after graduating from a Technical-Commercial school Filippini studied music and chant and later entered the Sistine Chapel Choir. In 1963 he won the Castrocaro Music Festival, and in 1964 he entered the competition at the Sanremo Music Festival with the song "Sabato sera", which was also a moderate success on the Italian hit parade. The same year he also participated at Un disco per l'estate and at the Festival di Napoli.

In 1965 he returned at the Sanremo Music Festival, becoming successful with the song "L'amore ha i tuoi occhi". In the second half of the 1960s he also had some occasional experiences as a composer and as a film actor. In 1968 he was invited by Franco Zefirelli to perform the song "Canzone d'amore/Ai Giochi Addio" in the Italian release of his Romeo and Juliet film (voiced by Glen Weston as "What is a Youth" in the English-language release}. When his success declined in the 1970s, he focused on live performances in piano bars and music halls, as well as apparitions on several revival TV-programs.

Discography
Singles
 
 1963 – La ragazza nell'acqua/L'anno venturo (MRC A200)
 1964 – Sabato sera/Bimba ricordati (MRC A203)
 1964 – Non ho il coraggio/Ti voglio ancora bene (MRC A206)
 1964 – Ho paura dell'amore/Non ho bisogno di te (MRC A208)
 1964 – Ammore siente/Maria Carmela ela...ela (MRC A209)
 1965 – L'amore ha i tuoi occhi/Fortunatamente (MRC A212)
 1965 – Quando il sole cadrà/È inutile piangere (MRC A222)
 1965 – Lasciatemi qui/Noi saremo insieme (MRC A226)
 1968 – La felicità/Un piccolo aiuto dagli amici (RCA Italiana PM 3450)
 1968 – Canzone d'amore/Hip, hip, hip, hurrah! (RCA Italiana PM 3472)
 1971 – Pace e bene/Un collare d'argento (King NSP 56122)

Album 
 
 1999 – Il meglio (DV More Record)

Filmography

References

External links 

 

 

1945 births
Singers from Rome
Italian pop singers
Italian male singers
Living people